Thompson Transit is the public transit agency in Thompson, Manitoba, Canada. The City of Thompson contracts the bus services.

History

Before 1995
Operation conducted under contract by Thompson Bus Lines.

1995-1998
Contract operator switched to Grey Goose Bus Lines.

1998-2007
Grey Goose Bus Lines purchased by Greyhound Canada

2007-present
Grey Goose Bus Lines, a division of Greyhound Canada, was acquired by FirstGroup.

Services
Weekday hours of operation are from 7:30 am to 6:10 pm with extended service on Friday to 9:10 pm. On Saturday hours of operation are from 11:00 am to 6:10 pm, with no Sunday service.

Thompson Transit operates two bus routes, which meet up at The Plaza Mall and Southwood as transfer points.

Routes

News 
On November 18, 2008, The installation of new bus shelters.
Council passes a resolution for the purchase of 2 New D35LFR Transit Buses from NewFlyer with City of Brandon order. As well revise current Transit routes for a more feasible bus service.
City Approves the purchase of two new Transit buses from New Flyer at a cost of $845,136.
On September 13, 2010 City Council approved new contract with Greyhound, the total cost to the city will be $1,364,393 over five years.

Transit shelter locations

Facilities
Grey Goose Bus Lines Bus Depot @ 81 Berens Road.

See also

 Public transport in Canada

References

Transit agencies in Manitoba
Thompson, Manitoba